Timothy M. Frye is an American political scientist. He is the Marshall D. Shulman Professor of Post-Soviet Foreign Policy in the Department of Political Science at Columbia University, and the author of several books about Russia and Eurasia.

Biography 
Frye received a B.A. in Russian language and literature from Middlebury College in 1986, an M.I.A. from the School of International and Public Affairs, Columbia University in 1992, and a Ph.D. from Columbia Graduate School of Arts and Sciences in 1997. Frye was the director of the Harriman Institute at Columbia University from 2009 to 2015 and Chair of the Political Science Department from 2016-2019.  From 2011-2022, he was the academic supervisor and leading research fellow of the International Center for the Study of Institutions and Development (ICSID) at the Higher School of Economics in Moscow and is now on leave from this position. Since 2016, he is the editor of Post-Soviet Affairs.

Awards 
He won the Best Book Award from the Comparative Democratization Section of the American Political Science Association for Building States and Markets after Communism: The Perils of Polarized Democracy in 2011. Previously, he won the 2001 Hewett Prize from the American Association for the Advancement of Slavic Studies.

Bibliography

 Weak Strongman: The Limits of Power in Putin's Russia. Princeton University Press, 2021.
 Property Rights and Property Wrongs: How Power, Institutions, and Norms Shape Economic Conflict in Russia. Cambridge University Press, 2017.
Building States and Markets After Communism: The Perils of Polarized Democracy. Cambridge University Press, 2010.
Brokers and Bureaucrats: Building Market Institutions in Russia. University of Michigan Press, 2000.

References

Living people
Middlebury College alumni
Columbia University faculty
American political scientists
Year of birth missing (living people)
School of International and Public Affairs, Columbia University alumni
Columbia Graduate School of Arts and Sciences alumni
Academic staff of the Higher School of Economics